Flávio Luis da Silva or simply Flávio (born September 12, 1975 in Sirinhaém), is a former Brazilian defender, he last plays for Barueri.

Career
Flávio joined on 30 July 2009 on trial to FC Schalke 04 and will eventually retiring, after failing from the trail retired on 13 August 2009.

References

1975 births
Living people
Ceará Sporting Club players
Brazilian footballers
Clube Náutico Capibaribe players
Grêmio Barueri Futebol players
Expatriate footballers in Turkey
Associação Atlética Ponte Preta players
MKE Ankaragücü footballers
Figueirense FC players
Sport Club Internacional players
Sociedade Esportiva Palmeiras players
Association football defenders